Spiritual Minded is the fifth solo studio album by American rapper and record producer KRS-One. It was released on January 22, 2002 through Koch Records. Recording sessions took place at Slammin' Studios. Production was handled by BB Jay, Bervin Harris, Calvin Tibbs, Chase, Cookies & Cream, Darren Quinlan, DJ Tiné Tim, Domingo, Douglas Jones, G. Simone, Terry A., and KRS-One himself. It features guest appearances from B.B. Jay, Fat Joe, Rampage, Rha Goddess, Smooth B. and T-Bone.

KRS-One's spiritual lyrical content came as a surprise to fans and critics, as he had previously written songs critical of Christianity and organized religion.

Track listing

Charts

References

External links

2002 albums
KRS-One albums
E1 Music albums
Christian hip hop albums
Albums produced by KRS-One
Albums produced by Domingo (producer)